Give It to Me is the second and final studio album by South Korean girl group Sistar. The album was released on June 11, 2013, by Starship Entertainment and distributed by LOEN Entertainment, with the song of the same title used as the promotional song. The album contains 11 songs.

Background and release
Starship Entertainment announced on May 16, 2013, that Sistar will return mid-June, with another confirmation on June 2 stating that they will be making their comeback with a second full album.

On June 3, 2013, teaser photos featuring members Dasom and Bora were released. On June 4, Sistar release photo teasers of all the members for "Give It to Me" and revealed that they will have a Moulin Rouge theme. A video teaser for "Give It to Me" was released on June 6.

On June 11, 2013, Sistar released the full album as well as the music video for "Give It to Me".

Promotions
Sistar performed at their showcase songs like "Give It to Me", "Hey You", "Miss Sistar" and "Crying".

Promotions for the album started on June 13, in Mnet's M! Countdown. The girls also promoted on KBS's Music Bank, MBC's Music Core and SBS's Inkigayo. The songs "Hey You" and "Miss Sistar" ware chosen to be part of their comeback.
The band released "The Way You Make Me Melt" as second single of the album.
"Summer Time" was released as promotional single of the album and was promoted in various shows and was released in August 2013.
"Crying" as the third single of the album and was released in September 2013.
The fourth and ultimate single was released in October 2013 and was "Bad Boy".
The second promotional single was released on November 2 and as "Hey You".

Reception
The title track, "Give It to Me", peaked at number 1 on Gaon's singles chart and Billboard'''s K-Pop Hot 100.

"Give It to Me" also received numerous first place award in various music show broadcasts, Triple Crown in Mnet's M! Countdown (June 20, 27 and July 4)  and in KBS Music Bank (June 21, 28 and July 5), Double crown in MBC Music Core (June 22 and 29) and in SBS Inkigayo (June 23 and 30) and a single win in MBC Music Show Champion'' (June 26).

Music program wins

Track listing

Chart performance

Sales and certifications

Release history

References

External links
 

2013 albums
Sistar albums
Kakao M albums
Korean-language albums
Starship Entertainment albums